is a Japanese screenwriter and historical novelist. Two of his novels have been adapted to films, The Floating Castle and Land of Stealth.

Life
He was born in Osaka but raised in Asaminami in Hiroshima. As a child he was an avid reader of SF novels, in particular Nerawareta Gakuen, but in high school he became more interested in films after watching The Terminator.
After graduating from Waseda University he worked for three years as an assistant director for a television production company.  
In 2003 his original screenplay won the "Kido Award" sponsored by the Motion Picture Producers Association of Japan to train and educate new screenwriters. In 2007 he made his debut as a fiction writer by turning his winning script into the historical novel  which sold over two million copies. The novel was adapted into a film in 2012 with Wada writing the script. In 2013 Wada published the two-volume historical novel , which garnered both the Booksellers Award and the Yoshikawa Eiji Prize for historical fiction and quickly became a bestseller.

Works
  - Shogakukan, 2007 - adapted into The Floating Castle (2012)
  - Shinchosha, 2008 - adapted into Mumon: The Land of Stealth (2017)
  - Shogakukan, 2009
  - Shinchosha, 2013

Manga

 Shinobi no Kuni illustrated by Mutsumi Banno - serialized in Monthly Shōnen Sunday (2009 - 2010, 4 Volumes)
 Shinobi no Kuni Anthology (2017, 1 Volume)
 Murakami Kaizoku no Musume illustrated by Shirō Yoshida - serialized in Big Comic Spirits (2015 - , 8 Volumes)

References

1969 births
Japanese historical novelists
Japanese screenwriters
Writers of historical fiction set in the early modern period
21st-century Japanese novelists
Waseda University alumni
Writers from Hiroshima
Living people
21st-century screenwriters